Felix Claar (born 5 January 1997) is a Swedish handball player for Aalborg Håndbold and the Swedish national team.

He made international debut on the Swedish national team in June 2017, against Poland.

Achievements
Danish Handball League:
Winner: 2021
 Runner-up: 2022
EHF Champions League:
 Runner-up: 2021
IHF Super Globe
 Bronze medal: 2021
Danish Handball Cup:
Winner: 2021
 Runner-up: 2020
Danish Super Cup:
Winner: 2020, 2021, 2022
Handbollsligan:
 Winner: 2014
 Runner-up: 2019
Individual Awards
 All-Star Team Danish League 2021–22
 All-Star Team Handbollsligan 2019/20
 MVP Handbollsligan 2018/19 and 2019/20
 "Årets Komet" 2016

References

1997 births
Living people
People from Norrköping Municipality
Swedish male handball players
Aalborg Håndbold players
Handball players at the 2020 Summer Olympics
Olympic handball players of Sweden
Sportspeople from Östergötland County